The J. R. Bryson House, located in Corvallis, Oregon, is a house that is listed on the National Register of Historic Places.

See also
 National Register of Historic Places listings in Benton County, Oregon

References

1882 establishments in Oregon
Houses in Corvallis, Oregon
Houses completed in 1882
Houses on the National Register of Historic Places in Oregon
Italianate architecture in Oregon
National Register of Historic Places in Benton County, Oregon